Arnulf Bryan "Arnie" Buquid Fuentebella (born January 29, 1976) is the incumbent representative of Camarines Sur's 4th district in the Philippines. He is also the former Municipal Mayor of Tigaon in the province of Camarines Sur.

Early life and education 
Arnulf Bryan "Arnie" Fuentebella was born on January 29, 1976, in Tigaon to former Speaker of the Philippine House of Representatives and Congressman Arnulfo "Noli" Fuentebella and Sagñay Municipal Mayor Evelyn B. Fuentebella. His brother is Camarines Sur's 4th district Representative Felix William B. Fuentebella. He graduated in the University of the Philippines Diliman being a Philosophy graduate and a member of the Upsilon Sigma Phi fraternity.

Political and professional career
Fuentebella entered politics after barangay captains of Tigaon asked him to run for mayor in the 2007 elections. He won the elections over the incumbent mayor.

He was instrumental for the proposed creation of a new province to be called as Nueva Camarines, which will be composed of the Fourth and Fifth Legislative Districts of Camarines Sur.

References

|-

1976 births
Nationalist People's Coalition politicians
Living people
Mayors of places in Camarines Sur
United Nationalist Alliance politicians
Arnulf Bryan
University of the Philippines Diliman alumni
Members of the House of Representatives of the Philippines from Camarines Sur